Ilir Bajri (born 1969) is a Kosovo Albanian jazz composer, pianist, and the director of Prishtina Jazz Festival. He has been a member of Classic Jazz Trio, Quasi Fusion Band, Ilir Bajri Quartet and has performed in different countries including Italy, Spain, and the United States.

Bajri is a member of Kosovan satirical political party Partia e Fortë.

References

1969 births
Kosovo Albanians
Kosovan composers
Kosovan jazz composers
Kosovan pianists
Kosovan jazz pianists
Living people
Musicians from Pristina
21st-century pianists